Cordylanthus tenuis is a species of flowering plant in the family Orobanchaceae known by the common name slender bird's beak. It is native to the US states of California, Oregon, and Nevada, where it grows in woodland and forest. It erects a spindly stem which may exceed a meter in height with sparse narrow leaves a few centimeters long, and is sometimes sticky with glandular secretions. The plant is greenish and tinted with yellow or purple coloration. The stem branches at intervals and at the end of each branch is a cluster of one to several flowers. Each pocket-shaped flower is one to two centimeters long and about one wide, made up of fuzzy maroon lobes with white or yellow lips.

There are several subspecies, including:
Cordylanthus tenuis subsp. barbatus - Fresno County slender bird's beak
Cordylanthus tenuis subsp. brunneus - serpentine bird's beak
Cordylanthus tenuis subsp. capillaris - Pennell's bird's beak
Cordylanthus tenuis subsp. pallescens - pallid bird's beak
Cordylanthus tenuis subsp. tenuis
Cordylanthus tenuis subsp. viscidus

External links
Jepson Manual Treatment
USDA Plants Profile
Photo gallery

tenuis